Svetlana Nikolayevna Baitova (born 3 September 1972) is a retired Belarusian gymnast. She won a gold medal at the 1988 Olympic Games as a member of the Soviet team and finished fourth in the all-around final at the 1987 World Championships.

Career
Baitova competed at the 1988 Summer Olympics and won a gold medal with the Soviet team. Individually, she finished 13th in the team competition but did not qualify for the all-around final (top 36) as she was the fourth ranked Soviet and the limit was three gymnasts per nation. Her best Individual result was seventh on the balance beam, but again she did not advance to the apparatus final (top 8), as she was the third Soviet (two gymnasts per nation was the limit for the apparatus finals). Her other results were ninth (uneven bars), 14th (vault) and 31st (floor). In 1988, she had not yet recovered from a hand fracture she received in 1987. Nevertheless, she was included on the team owing to her strong performance at the Olympic trials.

Baitova won a team silver medal and finished fourth in the all-around final at the 1987 World Championships. She also finished fourth in three of the four event finals; vault, uneven bars and floor exercise. She won a team gold medal the 1989 World Championships;

Eponymous skills
Baitova was the first gymnast to compete the double-twisting Yurchenko (DTY) vault, so it is named after her in the Code of Points. She also has an eponymous balance beam mount.

Retirement
She retired in 1990 and since 1991 works as gymnastics coach in Mogilev. In 1990 she married and gave birth to son Alex, but remarried later. In 2002, she was invited for coaching in Qatar on a five-year contract, but returned after 11 months because she could not tolerate the hot climate.

References

1972 births
Living people
Soviet female artistic gymnasts
Gymnasts at the 1988 Summer Olympics
Olympic gymnasts of the Soviet Union
Olympic gold medalists for the Soviet Union
Olympic medalists in gymnastics
Honoured Masters of Sport of the USSR
Belarusian female artistic gymnasts
Medalists at the 1988 Summer Olympics
Medalists at the World Artistic Gymnastics Championships
Originators of elements in artistic gymnastics
People from Mogilev
Sportspeople from Mogilev Region